Tumanak (also Romanized as Tūmānak) is a village in Vardanjan Rural District, Ben County, Chaharmahal and Bakhtiari Province, Iran. At the 2006 census, its population was 693, in 158 families. The village is populated by Persians and Turkic people.

References 

Populated places in Ben County